Lofgren Peninsula is an ice-covered peninsula about  long, projecting between Cadwalader Inlet and Morgan Inlet on the northeast side of Thurston Island, Antarctica. The northern extremity of the peninsula is Cape Menzel, a bold rock cape. The peninsula was named for Charles E. Lofgren, personnel officer with the Byrd Antarctic Expedition, 1928–30. The cape was named for Reinhard W. Menzel, a geomagnetist-seismologist with the Eights Station winter party, 1965.

Named features 
Walsh Knob is a small but distinctive ice-covered elevation that rises midway along the south side of the peninsula. It has a rounded appearance except for a cliff at the south side. It was named by the US-ACAN after R.W. Walsh, Photographer's Mate in the Eastern Group of U.S. Navy Operation Highjump, which obtained aerial photographs of Thurston Island and adjacent coastal areas, 1946–47.

Mills Cliff is an isolated rock cliff in the north-central part of the peninsula. It was named by US-ACAN after Aviation Machinist's Mate William H. Mills, an aircrewman in the Eastern Group of Operation Highjump.

Maps
 Thurston Island – Jones Mountains. 1:500000 Antarctica Sketch Map. US Geological Survey, 1967.
 Antarctic Digital Database (ADD). Scale 1:250000 topographic map of Antarctica. Scientific Committee on Antarctic Research (SCAR), 1993–2016.

References

Peninsulas of Ellsworth Land
Thurston Island